Star Studios (formerly known as Fox Star Studios) is an Indian motion picture production and distribution company. It is a wholly-owned subsidiary of Disney Star (via Walt Disney Studios and Disney Entertainment), part of the Disney International Operations segment of The Walt Disney Company. The studio produces Hindi, Tamil, Telugu, Malayalam and other South Asian language films through acquisitions, co-productions and in-house productions for worldwide distribution.

Star Studios was one of the 21st Century Fox and Star India film production companies that was acquired by Disney on March 20, 2019. The studio's current name was adopted on May 27, 2022 in order to avoid confusion with Fox Corporation.

Starting with the international release of Brahmāstra: Part One – Shiva (2022), all of Star Studios' films are now handled internationally by Walt Disney Studios Motion Pictures.

History 

The studio was founded in March 2008 as a joint venture between 20th Century Fox and co-owned by Star India.In 2009, the studio acquired the rights for My Name is Khan, the studio’s debut film as distributor.

In 2011, Fox Star Studios entered the Tamil film industry with Engaeyum Eppothum, as co-producing and distributing partner for AR Murugadoss's AR Murugadoss Productions. In 2013, the studio released Tamil-feature Raja Rani, which won four Tamil Nadu State Film Awards. In 2015, the studio entered 9-film deal with Dharma Productions as a co-producer and distributor. In 2016, Kapoor & Sons was released as the first film under the arrangement. The same year, the studio won National Film Award for Best Feature Film in Hindi for its in-house production Neerja. The studio also released M.S. Dhoni: The Untold Story, the biopic of then Indian Cricket captain MS Dhoni. In 2017, the studio entered a three-film deal with Nadiadwala Grandson Entertainment. In May 2018, the studio entered multi-film deal with Akshay Kumar's Cape of Good films and had set Mission Mangal with Kumar attached to star. In 2019, the studio released Chhichhore which it co-produced with Nadiawala Grandson Entertainment had won National Film Award for Best Feature Film in Hindi 2019.

In early 2020, the studio had released Chhapaak starring Deepika Padukone, sports-drama Panga starring Kangana Ranaut and Vidhu Vinod Chopra's Shikara all of which are lukewarmly received by the audience. The studio had released Baaghi 3 at the start of the COVID-19 pandemic and the film ended its box-office run as the second-highest grossing Hindi-film of 2020. In June 2020, Star India, the parent company of the studio decided to release the rest of the 2020 slate directly on the sister streaming platform Disney+ Hotstar under Disney+ Hotstar Multiplex Initiative. The films released on the platform were Dil Bechara, Lootcase, Sadak 2, and Laxmii. In late 2020, several reports indicate The Walt Disney Company's was not going greenlighting newer films with the studio ceasing its operations after the releases of Tadap and Brahmāstra as the studio's CEO Vijay Singh has resigned. In December 2021, the studio released Tadap. In February 2022, the studio ended speculations of ceasing operations by announcing Babli Bouncer starring Tamannaah Bhatia, co-produced with Junglee Pictures. In March 2022, the company announced the release of Kaun Pravin Tambe? on Disney+ Hotstar. Soon after the studio started production on Manoj Bajpayee starrer Gulmohar. Later that month, the studio along with Dharma Productions had acquired the remake rights for blockbuster Malayalam film Hridayam in Hindi, Tamil, and Telugu.

On 27 May 2022, Fox Star Studios was renamed Star Studios, as part of the removal of the "Fox" name from studios that had been acquired from 21st Century Fox by Disney.

Logo and fanfare
The current print & on-screen Star Studios logo is based on 20th Century Studios logo and Star logo from the general entertainment hub of Disney+ with same name. The print logo debuted in the posters of Brahmāstra: Part One Shiva and the on-screen logo debuted in the theatrical release of Brahmāstra: Part One Shiva and the HD version of the logo appeared in Babli Bouncer.

The Fox Star Studios logo was based on the 1994-2009 20th Century Fox logo (the logo appeared in Quick Gun Murugun & and the end of My Name is Khan) and the 2009 style was made by the now-defunct Blue Sky Studios (who made the 2009-2020 20th Century Fox logo), the 2010-2022 Fox Star Studios logo (albeit with the News Corporation byline removed in 2013) debuted in My Name is Khan and the last film to use is Kaun Pravin Tambe?, also a prototype version exists.

The current logo of Star Studios debuted in the theatrical release of Brahmāstra and an HD Version of the logo appeared in Babli Bouncer, the logo is based on Picturemill's work, in turn based on Blue Sky's design.

The current Star Studios fanfare was arranged by A.R. Rahman and based on Alfred Newman's 20th Century Studios fanfare, which is currently composed by David Newman, This version has Indian instruments such as sitar, sarod, tambura, sahnai, sarangi, and tabla being heard in the composition. It also sounds similar to the 1979 and 1982 fanfares.

Filmography

See also 
 20th Century Studios
 UTV Motion Pictures
 List of Walt Disney Pictures India films
 List of Walt Disney Pictures films

References 

20th Century Studios
Disney acquisitions
Disney India films
Disney production studios
Disney Star
Film distributors of India
Film organisations in India
Film production companies based in Mumbai
Film production companies of India
Former News Corporation subsidiaries
Indian companies established in 2008
Indian subsidiaries of foreign companies
Star
The Walt Disney Company subsidiaries